"Little Moments" is a song co-written and recorded by American country music singer Brad Paisley.  It was released in September 2003 as the second single from Paisley's album Mud on the Tires.  Paisley wrote this song with Chris DuBois.

Content
Brad Paisley has stated that his wife Kimberly Williams-Paisley was the basis for this song and appears in the music video. Specifically the opening part, which reads as follows:

"Well I'll never forget the first time that I heard
that pretty mouth say that dirty word.
And I can't even remember now, what she backed
my truck into.
But she covered her mouth and her face got red and 
she just looked so darn cute.
That I couldn't even act like I was mad-
Yeah I live for little moments like that."

The two events were taken right from the first time Brad heard her swear and how she started to blush when he found a dent in his truck.

Music video
The music video was directed by Jim Shea and Peter Tilden. It features different couples who explain how they started their relationships. The last couple is Paisley and his own wife, Kimberly Williams-Paisley, talking. His wife implies that song was written about her. Except for a few quick shots during the guitar solo, the video features Brad entirely with his signature cowboy hat off. It was released in early 2004.

Personnel
Randle Currie - steel guitar
Eric Darken - percussion
Kevin "Swine" Grantt - bass guitar
Bernie Herms - piano
Wes Hightower - background vocals
Gordon J. Mote - B3 organ
Brad Paisley - lead vocals, electric guitar, acoustic guitar, Tic tac bass
Ben Sesar - drums
Justin Williamson - fiddle

Chart performance
"Little Moments" debuted at number 58 on the U.S. Billboard Hot Country Singles & Tracks for the week of September 6, 2003.

Year-end charts

References

2003 singles
2003 songs
Country ballads
2000s ballads
Brad Paisley songs
Songs written by Brad Paisley
Song recordings produced by Frank Rogers (record producer)
Arista Nashville singles
Songs written by Chris DuBois